Ickham is a village.

Ickham may also refer to:

Ickham and Well, a civil parish in Kent, South East England
Thomas Ickham (died 1415), MP for Canterbury
William Ickham (died 1424), MP for Canterbury